Teuku is an Indonesian name that may refer to
Teuku Jacob (1929–2007), Indonesian paleoanthropologist
Teuku Mohammad Hamzah Thayeb (born 1952), Indonesian diplomat
Teungku Nyak Arif (1899–1946), Acehnese nationalist and National Hero of Indonesia
Teuku Rifnu Wikana (born 1980), Indonesian actor
Teuku Umar (1854–1899), leader of a guerrilla campaign against the Dutch in Aceh, Indonesia
Teuku Wisnu (born 1985), Indonesian soap opera actor

Indonesian names